There is a community of Americans living in Argentina consisting of immigrants and expatriates from the United States as well as their local born descendants. There are roughly about 60,000 Americans living in the country, and 26,000 of them live in the capital city, Buenos Aires.

Migration history
From 2002 to 2003, many Americans migrated to Argentina when the country suddenly became comparatively inexpensive thus it became a cheap place to live in.

Immigration from the United States increased further during and after the financial crisis of 2007–2008 as many Americans fled the crisis-ridden United States to escape to Argentina. A few interviews and immigration data shows a 12% increase in the number of Americans (742) who applied for permanent residency in 2008.

Education
American schools in Argentina include:
 Asociación Escuelas Lincoln (Buenos Aires)

Notable people

 Guy Williams (1924–1989), actor
 Adrián Suar (born 1968), actor, producer, and businessman
 Amán Rawson (1792–1847),  physician and merchant, politician
 Andrea Collarini (born 1992), tennis player
 Benjamin Apthorp Gould (1824–1896), astronomer
 Bernhard Dawson (1890–1960), astronomer
 Tranquilo Cappozzo (1918–2003), rower and Olympic champion 
 Charles Dillon Perrine (1867–1951), astronomer
 John M. Thome (1843–1908), astronomer
 Jonas Coe (1805–1864), naval commander
 Bryan Gerzicich (born 1984), football player
 Dan Newland (born 1949), journalist, translator, and writer
 Kevin Johansen (born 1964), rock musician
 Maxine Swann (born 1969), fiction author
 Melville Sewell Bagley (1838–1880), businessman and creator of Hesperidina, the unofficial Argentine national liqueur
 Renato Corsi (born 1963), association football player
 Richard Maury (1882–1950), railway engineer and designer of the iconic  train service
 Richard Shindell (born 1960), folk songwriter
 Roy Cortina (born 1964), politician and President of the Socialist Party in Buenos Aires
 Viggo Mortensen (born 1958), actor 
 William Henry Hudson (1841–1922), author, naturalist and ornithologist
 Jorge Newberry, aviation pioneer

See also

 Argentina–United States relations
 Argentine Americans

References

Argentina
 
Americans
Argentina–United States relations
American emigration